An optical jukebox is a robotic data storage device that can automatically load and unload optical discs, such as Compact Disc, DVD, Ultra Density Optical or Blu-ray and can provide terabytes (TB) or petabytes (PB) of tertiary storage.  The devices are often called optical disk libraries, "optical storage archives", robotic drives, or autochangers.  Jukebox devices may have up to 2,000 slots for disks, and usually have a picking device that traverses the slots and drives. Zerras Inc. provides a removeable capsule that holds up to 200 discs per library which can be  scaled-out to manage 1600 discs per 42U rack unit.  The arrangement of the slots and picking devices affects performance and maintenance costs, depending on the robotics design, the space between a disk and the picking device. Seek times and transfer rates vary depending upon the optical technology used.

History and function 
One of the first examples of an optical jukebox was the unit designed and built at the Royal Aerospace Establishment at Farnborough, England.  The unit had twin read/write heads,  12" WORM disks and the carousels were pneumatically driven.  It was produced to replace the 1/2 inch magnetic tape devices that were being used to store satellite data.

Jukeboxes are used in high-capacity archive storage environments such data centers and on-premise server rooms to store long-term data such as imaging, medical, compliance records, video and other high-value data assets, objects, and files.  Hierarchical storage management is a strategy that moves little-used or unused files from fast magnetic storage to optical jukebox devices in a process called migration.  If the files are needed, they are migrated back to magnetic disk.  Optical disc libraries are also useful for making backups and in disaster recovery situations. Today one of the most important uses for jukeboxes is to archive data. Archiving data is different from backups in that the data is stored on media designed to last up to 100 years. The data is usually permanently written on Write Once Read Many (WORM)-type discs so it cannot be erased or changed.

Jukeboxes typically contain internal SCSI- or SATA-based recordable drives (CD-ROM, CD-R, DVD-ROM, DVD-R, DVD-RAM, UDO or Blu-ray) that connect directly to a file server and are managed by a third-party jukebox management software. This software controls the movement of media within the jukebox, and the pre-mastering of data prior to the recording process.

Before the advent of the modern SAN and much cheaper hard disks, high-volume storage on DVD was more cost-effective than magnetic media.  Jukebox capacities have greatly increased with the release of the 128 gigabyte (GB) quad layer Blu-ray (BD) format, with a road-map to increase to eight layers and 200 GB per disc. The current format, used in the DISC ArXtor7000 library, allows 89 TB of storage from a single 700-disc jukebox.  Optical disc libraries like the TeraStack Solution can store up to 142 TB of online and nearline data with a nominal power draw of 425 watts. These two units show the wide variance of product attributes.  The optical storage archive library from Zerras allows up to 25TB of removeable optical storage in a single unit library with a power draw of 60 watts per unit and scale to 200TB in a 42U rack cluster.  The Zerras Icebox differs from Sony Optical Data Archive libraries is it uses approved standard dual, tri, and quad layer blu-ray discs rather than proprietary Archival Disc standard format which is not backward compatible to standard blu-ray drives and discs in the market.

Management software 
The core functionality of optical library management software can be broken down into four parts: robotic control, filesystem authoring, file tracking, and access control.

Robotic control 
All optical libraries comply with the standard SCSI command set. These commands are used for control and library geometry querying. When the management software is run, it will send inquiry requests to the optical library for the status of its contents. Number and type of drives, number and status of slots and other essential information is gathered. Following this, the management software may request data off of a particular piece of media or it may wish to perform some write operations on it. Any of these actions would require specific move commands sent from the management application to the optical library. An example of this would be to move a media from slot 50 to the drive number 3.

Filesystem authoring 
Optical library management software handles all of the writing and reading of the filesystem content on the optical media. Once a media has been placed in a drive from its home slot, many operations can be taken. For example: The creation of a UDF filesystem on a blank media, the writing of a single file, or the reading of some data off of the filesystem on the media.
Filesystem types available for optical media range from ISO standard technologies like UDF to proprietary formats.

File tracking 
Optical library management software will often track the files and folders extant on a piece of optical media by means of a database. Any filesystem data pertaining to an individual media would be available in this database. For example: paths and names of files and folders, file sizes, and all of the metadata that a modern filesystem may keep.

Access control 
Optical library management software makes itself available to the OS in an assortment of ways. One of these ways in a Windows environment, is by way of virtual drive letters. Essentially, the whole of an optical library can be viewed, read to and written to via a virtual filesystem while the management software handles all of the media movement and I/O requests invisibly in the background.

Another way that access to the optical library may be accomplished is by way of CIFS shares (more often seen with Unix-type optical library management applications).

Access time issues 
All the jukeboxes work best when only a few users need to access the discs at the same time. Small jukeboxes have only one or two CD, DVD, UDO or Blu-ray drives, so only one or two users can share the jukebox at the same time. If additional users want to use a new disc, they have to wait for the disc to be swapped by the robotics in the jukebox. This takes from 4 to 9 seconds.  Larger jukeboxes have six or more readers, so more users can simultaneously access the different discs at the same time. A more efficient recommendation is to have a disk cache attached to the jukebox for a higher number of simultaneous users. This way, the configuration operates in a FILO (First In Last Out) Manner. Here, files accessed are only sent back to the optical discs after they have been utilized. Changes may or may not be saved or versioned based on the user configuration and accessibility settings on the storage management software that runs the optical jukebox. The number of drives in the jukebox can be up to six depending on the size of the jukebox. The drives will read and write the data to the RAID / Disc cache and then present to end users. This way the 4–6 seconds read time only occurs during the initial data read process, then the data is sent to the cache.

References

External links
 DISC Archiving Systems – ArXtor Appliance Series (former NSM GmbH)
 Zerras | ICEBOX

Optical computer storage